Domingos Sousa Coutinho Meneses Duarte (born 10 March 1995) is a Portuguese professional footballer who plays as a central defender for La Liga club Getafe and the Portugal national team.

Club career

Sporting CP
Born in Cascais, Lisbon District, Duarte joined Sporting CP's youth academy at the age of 16. He spent two full seasons with their reserves in the Segunda Liga to kickstart his senior career, his first match in the competition occurring on 5 October 2014 when he played 90 minutes in the 2–1 home win against C.D. Trofense.

Duarte served loan spells from 2016 to 2018, respectively at C.F. Os Belenenses and G.D. Chaves and with both clubs competing in the Primeira Liga. He made his league debut on 14 August 2016 while at the service of the former in a 2–0 away loss to Vitória de Setúbal, and scored his first goal on 1 October of the same year in a 3–1 defeat at precisely Chaves.

On 3 August 2018, still owned by Sporting, Duarte signed with Deportivo de La Coruña with an option to buy. He scored in his very first appearance in the Spanish Segunda División, helping the visitors earn a point at Albacete Balompié after the 1–1 draw.

Granada
On 14 July 2019, Duarte joined recently-promoted Granada CF on a four-year deal for a €3 million fee, with Sporting keeping 25% of future sale rights. He made his La Liga debut on 17 August, playing the entire 4–4 away draw against Villarreal CF, and scored his first goal on 5 October in a 4–2 loss at Real Madrid.

Duarte started in ten of his 11 appearances in the 2020–21 UEFA Europa League, as his team reached the quarter-finals. On 20 September 2021, he headed home in the first half of an eventual 1–1 away draw with FC Barcelona.

Getafe
On 11 July 2022, following Granada's relegation, Duarte remained in the Spanish top division after signing a four-year contract with Getafe CF.

International career
Duarte won his only cap for the Portugal under-21 side on 24 March 2017, when he featured 11 minutes in a 3–1 friendly win over Norway in Estoril. In November 2019, manager Fernando Santos called him up for the first time to the senior team ahead of UEFA Euro 2020 qualifiers against Luxembourg and Lithuania.

On 11 November 2020, Duarte made his full debut, in a 7–0 rout of Andorra in another exhibition at the Estádio da Luz. In October 2022, he was included in a preliminary 55-man squad for the 2022 FIFA World Cup in Qatar.

Career statistics

Club

International

Honours
Individual
UEFA European Under-19 Championship Team of the Tournament: 2014

References

External links

Portuguese League profile 

1995 births
Living people
Sportspeople from Cascais
Portuguese footballers
Association football defenders
Primeira Liga players
Liga Portugal 2 players
G.D. Estoril Praia players
Sporting CP B players
C.F. Os Belenenses players
G.D. Chaves players
La Liga players
Segunda División players
Deportivo de La Coruña players
Granada CF footballers
Getafe CF footballers
Portugal youth international footballers
Portugal under-21 international footballers
Portugal international footballers
Portuguese expatriate footballers
Expatriate footballers in Spain
Portuguese expatriate sportspeople in Spain